This is a list of the wool, cotton and other textile mills in Bradford, the largest settlement in the Metropolitan Borough of Bradford in West Yorkshire, England.

Allerton (Bradford)

Bolton (Bradford)

Bowling (Bradford)

Bradford

Heaton (Bradford)

Horton (Bradford)

Manningham (Bradford)

See also
Heavy Woollen District
Textile processing

References

Footnotes

The National Monument Record is a legacy numbering system maintained 
by English Heritage. Further details on each mill may be obtained from this url. http://yorkshire.u08.eu/

Notes

Bibliography

External links

 01
Bradford
Bradford
Lists of buildings and structures in Bradford
History of the textile industry
Industrial Revolution in England